A Google Chrome App, or commonly just Chrome App, was a certain type of (non-standardized) web application that ran on the Google Chrome web browser. Chrome apps can be obtained from the Chrome Web Store where apps, extensions, and themes can be installed or bought. There are two types of apps, hosted and packaged, which have different locations of their executable and are targeted at different use cases. Support for Chrome Apps has been removed from Chrome in June 2022, except on ChromeOS where support has been extended until at least January 2025.

History
On August 19, 2016, Google announced that it would begin phasing out Chrome Apps for Windows, Mac and Linux (both packaged and hosted) by the end of 2016, finishing the process in early 2018. The company said that such apps would continue to be supported and maintained on ChromeOS "for the foreseeable future". The plan later changed, with Chrome Apps set to last until at least January 2025 for ChromeOS.

On January 15, 2020, Google announced that Chrome would begin phasing out support for Chrome Apps completely starting in March 2020, with support for consumers until June 2021 and enterprise until June 2022.

Types
Chrome apps can be hosted or packaged. Hosted apps have their background web pages on a remote server and the app acts like a bookmark or shortcut; packaged apps have off-line functionality making use of local storage.

Packaged
Packaged apps were launched on September 5, 2013. They have features very similar to a native desktop app, namely offline capable (by default), can interact with hardware devices, and can access local storage. Packaged apps are not confined to the regular Chrome interface and can display without a classic window menu and operating system user interface elements.

Hosted
Hosted apps are the original type of Chrome apps. They contain a single manifest file that contains the URL and additional information about the app. Hosted apps are usually offline and are subject to regular web page security restrictions.

See also
 Progressive web app

References

External links
 What Are Chrome Apps?

Software add-ons
Google Chrome
Google Chrome apps